Joe Hawkins (born 11 June 2002) is a Welsh international rugby union player who primarily plays centre for Ospreys in the United Rugby Championship. He has also represented Wales at international level, having made his test debut against Australia during the 2022 Autumn Internationals.

Club career
Hawkins began his career with the Pontardawe RFC youth team, later playing for Neath Port Talbot College and Neath Athletic. He represented Swansea Valley in the Dewar Shield. Hawkins briefly played rugby league, appearing for the West Wales Raiders, before concentrating solely on rugby union. Hawkins joined the Ospreys, initially playing for their U16 side, and progressed through the academy groups.

Hawkins was named in the Ospreys side for Round 4 of the 2020–21 Pro14 against Zebre, making his professional rugby debut at age 18. Hawkins scored his first professional try against Connacht on 26 November 2021.

Primarily an inside centre, Hawkins is also able to play as an outside half, starting in the position for the Ospreys in a Champions Cup match against Sale Sharks.

International career
Hawkins has represented Wales at U20 level. He first appeared for the team during the 2020 Six Nations Under 20s Championship, having been selected at age 17. Hawkins scored his first try for the U20 team on 13 July 2021, against Scotland, during the delayed 2021 Six Nations Under 20s Championship. He scored his second try in the subsequent tournament, again coming against Scotland as Wales came back to win. In the absence of the suspended Alex Mann, Hawkins was named as captain for the match against France.

Hawkins was selected as captain for the 2022 U20 Summer Series, and converted a late penalty against Italy to clinch the win. Wales reached the final of the tournament, but ultimately lost to South Africa.

Hawkins was named in the Wales squad for the 2022 Autumn series. On 26 November 2022, Hawkins made his Wales debut, starting against Australia at inside centre.

Returning head coach Warren Gatland named Hawkins in his squad for the 2023 Six Nations Championship, and Hawkins retained the inside centre shirt as the tournament began. He partnered Ospreys teammate George North in the midfield for the first two matches, against Ireland and Scotland. Hawkins again started against England in the third match, but with a new centre partner of Mason Grady, making his international debut. Only one year prior, Hawkins and Grady formed a midfield partnership at U20 level.

Personal life 
Hawkins's grandfather Brian represented Wales Youth in 1970, but did not appear for a full senior cap. Both his father and uncle attained caps from Wales U15 to U21 level. His father David was also a centre, and played for Aberavon, Tonmawr and Carmarthen Quins.

References

External links

WRU Profile
Ospreys Profile

2002 births
Living people
Ospreys (rugby union) players
Rugby union centres
Rugby union players from Swansea
Welsh rugby union players
Wales international rugby union players